For the Working Class Man is the second studio album by former Cold Chisel frontman Jimmy Barnes, released in December 1985. The album consists of five original tracks and seven remixed tracks that had previously been released on Barnes' 1984 debut album Bodyswerve.

Details
For the Working Class Man (re-titled Jimmy Barnes for the international market—after the original title of A Week Away from Paradise was scrapped—with a slightly altered track listing and different cover artwork) was specifically geared toward securing Barnes a break into the American music market by Geffen. The new material found on the album was recorded in New York and Los Angeles with a variety of high-profile American producers, session musicians, and outside songwriters. Journey's Jonathan Cain contributed, produced and performed on two tracks, "Working Class Man" (which has since become Barnes' signature song as a solo artist after being featured in the Ron Howard film Gung Ho) and "American Heartbeat", Steven Van Zandt of Bruce Springsteen's E Street Band co-wrote "Ride the Night Away", Chas Sandford penned "I'd Die to Be with You Tonight" and "Without Your Love" was co-written with former Rainbow keyboardist Tony Carey.

In 2010 the album was remastered and reissued under the title "For the Working Class Man 25" under license to Liberation Music for Australia and New Zealand. This reissue has the same songs in the same order as the original release, however, four of the tracks ("I'd Die to Be with You Tonight", "Ride the Night Away", "Working Class Man" and "No Second Prize") were extensively reworked in 2009 by David Nicholas (for DNA Productions) resulting in significantly different track lengths. The album cover of the reissue is derived from the original Australian version; the most significant differences being the addition of an outer black square framing border, a bold black number "25" in the lower left hand corner while the main photograph has an (apparently) deeper red saturation.

In October 2010, For the Working Class Man, was listed in the book, 100 Best Australian Albums.

As of 2012, For the Working Class Man has sold more than 500,000 copies (7 x Platinum) in Barnes' native Australia.

In October 2017, a two disc "Commemorative Edition" of the album was released; the first disc contains the original album remastered by Don Bartley, the second disc (a DVD) contains a live performance from 1984. This release coincided with the release of Barnes' memoir 'Working Class Man', as well as his spoken word tour of the same name, starting in 2018.

Track listing

For the Working Class Man

Jimmy Barnes / A Week Away from Paradise

Charts

Weekly charts

Year-end charts

Certifications

Personnel
Jimmy Barnes - lead vocals
Tommy Thayer, Chas Sandford, Mal Eastick, Waddy Wachtel, Dave Amato, Charlie Sexton, Billy Burnette, Chris Stockley, Johnny Lee - guitar
Randy Jackson, Kenny Gradney, Bruce Howe - bass
Tony Braunagel, Mick Fleetwood, Tony Brock, Ray Arnott - drums
Jonathan Cain, William Smith, Bill Payne - keyboards
Arno Lewis - percussion
Kim Carnes, Maxine Willard, Julia Tillman, Dave Amato, Jonathan Cain, Renée Geyer, Venetta Fields, Shauna Jenson - backing vocals
Chris Stockley - mandolin
Viv Riley - bagpipes

See also
 List of number-one albums in Australia during the 1980s

References

1985 albums
Jimmy Barnes albums
Albums produced by Mark Opitz
Geffen Records albums
Mushroom Records albums
Working-class culture